Cù Lao Dung is a township and capital of Cù Lao Dung District, Sóc Trăng Province, Vietnam.

References

Populated places in Sóc Trăng province
District capitals in Vietnam
Townships in Vietnam